General Watts may refer to:

Herbert Watts (1858–1934), British Army lieutenant general
John Watts (British Army officer) (1930–2003), British Army lieutenant general
Ronald L. Watts (born 1934), U.S. Army lieutenant general

See also
Angus Watt (fl. 1970s-2000s), Canadian Forces lieutenant general
Redmond Watt (born 1950), British Army general